Childress may refer to:

People
 Alice Childress (1916–1994), American playwright and author
 Alvin Childress, American actor
 Bam Childress, American football player
 Bob Childress (1890–1956), American Presbyterian minister 
 Brad Childress, American football coach
 David Hatcher Childress, a writer on alternative archeology
 Dimeco Childress, American basketball player
 Frank Childress, American rapper, known professionally as Comethazine
 Fred Childress (born 1966), Canadian football league player
 George Childress, lawyer, statesman and principal author of the Texas Declaration of Independence
 James Childress, American philosopher and theologian
 Jimmy Childress, American football coach
 Joe Childress (1933–1986), American NFL player
 Josh Childress, American basketball player
 Kallie Flynn Childress, American actress
 Mark B. Childress, American ambassador
 Mark Childress, American novelist
 Nina Childress (born 1961), French-American artist
 O. J. Childress, American football player
 Patricia Childress (born 1971), American actress
 Paul Childress, American powerlifter
 Randolph Childress, American basketball player
 Ray Childress, American football player
 Richard Childress, American NASCAR driver and entrepreneur
 Rob Childress, American college baseball coach
 Robert Childress, American artist and illustrator of "Dick and Jane"
 Rocky Childress (born 1962), American baseball player
 Ross Childress, American musician
 Sarah Childress Polk (1803–1891), U.S. First Lady from 1845 to 1849
 William Childress (born 1933), American author

Places
 Childress, Texas
 Childress County, Texas
 Childress, Montgomery County, Virginia
 Childress, Goochland County, Virginia

See also
 Alice Childress (song)

English-language surnames